A Bird in the House, first published in 1970, is a short story sequence written by Margaret Laurence. Noted by Laurence to be "semi-autobiographical", the series chronicles the growing up of a young agnostic writer, Vanessa MacLeod, in the fictional town of Manawaka, Manitoba. A Bird in the House was written from the perspective of Vanessa at age forty, while she recalls her childhood (with the exception of the final chapter Jericho's Brick Battlements, when she revisits her childhood home). It is therefore impossible to tell if young Vanessa was truly able to understand the events unfolding around her, or if she gained that understanding later in life. Originally published as a series of independent short stories,

Main characters

Vanessa MacLeod: 
The protagonist, various ages throughout the novel. The character is a middle-aged woman who uses flashback to reveal lessons learned from her family as she grows up. 
 
Beth MacLeod, Vanessa's mother:
Beth is a former nurse, as it is revealed in Chapter 3, "The Mask of the Bear". Now that she has children, she is a homemaker and peacemaker. She avoids conflict, especially with her hot-tempered father. She has a close relationship with her sister, Edna.

Ewen MacLeod, Vanessa's father:
A doctor, like his father. He is unable to make money to support the family during the great depression, a time when people often pay him in chicken and potatoes. His father-in-law, Timothy Connor, often criticizes him for this lack of wealth. He was a soldier during World War I, and witnessed the death of his younger brother Roderick. It is possible that he blames himself for his brother's death. He has an extensive collection of books about travel, which he thumbs through longingly, but never uses because he has never been able to travel.

Roderick MacLeod, Vanessa's younger brother:
Born in Chapter 2, "To Set Our House In Order". He is named after Ewen's brother, who died in World War I.

Edna Connor:
Beth's sister, Vanessa's maternal aunt. A light-hearted and beautiful but troubled woman. She lives with her parents until she is twenty-eight, cooking and cleaning, unable to find a job and unwilling to marry simply for escape. Vanessa loves her for her kindness and admires her for her glamour. She and Vanessa are the only characters who argue with Timothy Connor. In Chapter 3, "The Mask Of The Bear", she receives a visit from an old lover, Jimmy Lorimer. He comes to the house for dinner, and Edna's father is cruel and rude to him. The author implies that all of Edna's suitors have received this kind of harsh treatment. In Chapter 8, "Jericho's Brick Battlements", she marries Wes Grigg, who works for the Canadian National Railway. The narrator implies that Edna has found happiness with Wes, who shares Edna's warm sense of humour, and who is able to stand up to Grandfather Connor.

Timothy Connor:
Vanessa's maternal grandfather. He is married to Agnes Connor, and they have several adult children. Two of them are his daughters, Beth and Edna. He is a prejudiced, gruff, impatient, unsympathetic, demanding, complaining person, who constantly criticizes. Many of the novel's conflicts focus on the other characters trying to ask him for help or approval, which he refuses. He is represented in several symbols in the novel, including his proud brick house, his rugged bear-skin coat, and his dilapidated old car. He has worked hard for all of his life, something he brings up often and loudly. He proclaims at various points throughout the novel, "all labour unions were composed of thugs and crooks; if people were unemployed it was due to their own laziness; if people were broke it was because they were not thrifty" (Chapter 3, "The Mask of the Bear").

Agnes Connor:
Vanessa's maternal grandmother. Quiet, religious, unfailingly kind and calm. She is a foil character for her husband, and she is the only character to successfully oppose him. For example, when Timothy Connor has a fight with his brother Dan, Agnes quietly states "you'd best go after him", which Timothy does (Chapter 1, "The Sound of the Singing"). Because she never reveals any of her emotions on the surface, she is a difficult character to understand, something which Vanessa points out several times. "It was tacitly understood among all members of the family that Grandmother was not to be upset. Only Grandfather was allowed to upset her. The rest of us coddled her gladly, assuming that she needed protection...If it had been a weekday, she would have been knitting an afghan, but as it was Sunday she was reading the Bible with the aid of a magnifying glass. She did not believe in eyeglasses, which were, she thought, unnatural. She did not believe in smoking or drinking or the playing of cards, either, but she never pushed her beliefs at other people nor made any claims for her own goodness" (Chapter 1, "The Sound of the Singing").

Dan Connor:
Timothy Connor's brother, Vanessa's great uncle. Vanessa describes him as "downright", because he is low-class. "He had a farm in South Wachakwa Valley, but he never planted any crops. He raised horses, and spent most of his time travelling around the country, selling them. At least, he was supposed to be selling them, but Aunt Edna said that he had horse-trading in his blood and couldn't resist swapping, so he usually came back to Manawaka with the same number of horses he started out with, only they were different horses and no money. He had never married. [Vanessa] liked him because he always carried brown hot-tasting humbugs in his pockets, usually covered with navy fluff from his coat, and he sang Irish songs" (Chapter 1, "The Sound of the Singing"). Nevertheless, Vanessa is embarrassed by him because he is often unkempt and dirty, and he is eccentric and overly friendly.

Grandmother MacLeod:

Vanessa's paternal grandmother. A conservative woman who is unable to accept the family's change in circumstances. She behaves as if the family is still wealthy, ordering fancy linens and silver from catalogues

Chapter summaries 

A Bird in The House has been reprinted multiple times. A   new edition was issued by McClelland & Stewart as part of the New Canadian Library in January 2010.

CHAPTER 1: The Sound of the Singing
In this chapter, we get to know Vanessa, a 12-year-old girl, and her family. She describes herself as a "professional listener" because she grows up in an adult environment, so she hears all their conversations.
That night, the family will have dinner in the Brick House, Nessa's grandparent's house. They received an unexpected visit from Uncle Dan. Agnes, Vanessa's grandmother, asks her husband to treat him nicely and behave. So, he is the only one allowed to smoke in the house. 
The visitor is a cheerful person and starts to sing. Timothy (her brother and Nessa's grandfather) stops him and gets furious when he asks him for money. He throws him out of the house, but obeying orders from his wife (Agnes), he goes and looks for him outside.
That is when the child discovers that Uncle Dan was once in love with her grandma. 
Both brothers come inside again and share a coffee. Then, Uncle Dan leaves the house, singing, and Vanessa runs after him to keep him company for a while.

Chapter 2: To Set Our House in Order.
In chapter two of "A Bird in the House" by Margaret Laurence, the narrator, Vanessa, recounts her childhood memories of growing up in the small town of Manawaka, Manitoba. She reflects on her family, including her mother and father, her grandparents, and her aunt. Vanessa describes her family as being close-knit, but also notes the tension and conflicts that existed within the household. She also describes the town of Manawaka and the people who lived there, painting a picture of a tight-knit community where everyone knew each other's business. The chapter ends with Vanessa reflecting on the role of storytelling in her family and the way it helped her to understand and make sense of her experiences.

Chapter 3:  The Mask of the Bear.
In chapter three of "A Bird in the House" by Margaret Laurence, the narrator, Vanessa, continues to reflect on her childhood memories of growing up in the small town of Manawaka. She describes her relationship with her grandparents, particularly her grandfather, who she was very close with. She also talks about her grandmother, who was a strict and religious woman, who was always concerned about the moral well-being of the family. Vanessa describes how her grandparents' home was a place of refuge for her, where she felt safe and loved. She also describes the role that religion played in her family, with her grandmother being a devout member of the Baptist church, and how this affected the family's beliefs and values. The chapter ends with Vanessa reflecting on the sense of belonging and rootedness that she felt in Manawaka, and how it shaped her identity.  The chapter contains the death of Vanessa's Grandmother Connor, and highlights the strained relationship she had with her husband, Grandfather Connor.  He is shown to be a proud man without the ability to show strong emotions other than contempt or anger - to don the "mask of the bear".  His relationship with his daughters, especially with Vanessa's aunt Edna, is also highlighted, with Timothy Connor revealed as a controlling and difficult man who often scared Edna's suitors away.

References

1970 short story collections
Books by Margaret Laurence
Manitoba in fiction
Canadian short story collections
New Canadian Library